Clear River can refer to:
Clear River (Sitka, Alaska), a river in the city-borough of Sitka, Alaska
Clear River (Yukon-Koyukuk, Alaska), a river in the Yukon-Koyukuk Census Area, Alaska
Clear River (Rhode Island), a river in northwest Rhode Island
Clear River (Alberta), a river in northern Alberta, Canada, a tributary of the Peace River
Clear River (British Columbia), a tributary of the Kingcome River in the Central Coast region of British Columbia, Canada
Clear Rivers, a fictional character from the Final Destination series
Klarälven, a river in Sweden and Norway

See also
 Qingshui (disambiguation), Chinese for Clear River
 Lô River, Vietnamese for Clear River
 Evil in Clear River, 1988 U.S made-for-TV film